The Daly Waters Airfield, also RAAF Base Daly Waters, is a former commercial and sporadically-used military airfield located at , Northern Territory, Australia. As Australia's first international airfield, Daly Waters was used throughout the 1920s and 1930s as a stop over for commercial airlines operating on the domestic route to Western Australia and international carriers flying from Australia into south-east Asia. During World War II, the airbase was used by the Royal Australian Air Force (RAAF) and the United States Army Air Force to undertake combat operations against the Japanese in New Guinea, the Dutch East Indies and the islands to Australia's north. Following the war, the airbase was used commercially again up until the 1970s when the airfield was sporadically-used by the RAAF.

History
Daly Waters was Australia's first international airfield. The airfield was a centre for the London to Sydney air race of 1926 and was a refuelling stop for early QANTAS flights to Singapore. During the 1930s, the growth of international air travel meant the airport became a busy hub, despite its isolation and rudimentary facilities. The airfield was served by QANTAS, Australian National Airways and Guinea Airways as well as being an important connection point for MacRobertson Miller Airlines flights to Western Australia.

World War II
In the early months of 1942, following the outbreak of hostilities in the Pacific against the Japanese, the airfield was used a waypoint on the "Brereton Route" for operations between Australia and Java. The RAAF requisitioned the airfield and on 15 March 1942 it became RAAF Base Daly Waters; and operations commenced on 15 May 1942.

The 64th Bomb Squadron of the United States Army Air Forces Fifth Air Force 43rd Bombardment Group were based at Daly Waters from 16 May 1942 until 2 August 1942, flying B-17 Flying Fortresses from the airfield. The squadron made numerous attacks on Japanese shipping in the Dutch East Indies and the Bismarck Archipelago. Other operations during this period included support for ground forces on New Guinea; attacks on airfields and installations in New Guinea, the Bismarck Archipelago, Celebes, Halmahera, Yap, Palau, and the southern Philippines; and long-range raids against oil refineries on Ceram and Borneo.

Post-war use
In late 1943, the RAAF base was wound down as the war proceeded north, and the airfield was returned to civil use. Commercial traffic continued at the airfield until 1970. Ansett Australia and TAA operated one flight a week with TAA flying south in the morning and Ansett flying north in the evening. The last TAA flight took place on 1 April 1970 with Ansett concluding its operations a week or so later. The original Qantas hangar still stands, housing exhibits of photographs and equipment from the area's aviation past. The main runway, although deteriorated, appears to still be serviceable. The airfield is used by the RAAF for joint military manoeuvres.

Units based at Daly Waters airfield

See also
 United States Army Air Forces in Australia (World War II)
 List of airports in the Northern Territory
 List of Royal Australian Air Force installations

References

External links
  at 
 NT Heritage Listing
 19th Bombardment Association (Includes extensive photo album)

Royal Australian Air Force bases
Airfields of the United States Army Air Forces in Australia
World War II airfields in Australia
Defunct airports in the Northern Territory
Airports established in 1926
Military installations established in 1942
1926 establishments in Australia